Etchika Choureau (19 November 1929 – 25 January 2022) was a French film actress. She was at one point in a relationship with Hassan II of Morocco, who was then heir to the throne. Choureau died on 25 January 2022, at the age of 92.

Filmography

References

Bibliography 
 Jeanine Basinger. The World War II Combat Film: Anatomy of a Genre. Wesleyan University Press, 2003. 
 Stephen O. Hughes. Morocco Under King Hassan. Ithaca, 2001.

External links 

 

1929 births
2022 deaths
20th-century French actresses
Actresses from Paris
French film actresses